A signaling protocol is a type of communications protocol for encapsulating the signaling between communication endpoints and switching systems to establish or terminate a connection and to identify the state of connection.

The following is a list of signaling protocols:
 ALOHA
 Digital Subscriber System No. 1 (EDSS1)
 Dual-tone multi-frequency signaling
 H.248
 H.323
 H.225.0
 Jingle
 Media Gateway Control Protocol (MGCP)
 Megaco
 Regional System R1
 NBAP (Node B Application Part)
 Signalling System R2
 Session Initiation Protocol
 Signaling System No. 5
 Signaling System No. 6
 Signaling System No. 7
 Skinny Client Control Protocol (SCCP, Skinny)
 Q.931
 QSIG

Network protocols
Telephony signals